The National Development Bank of Botswana, (NDB Botswana), is a government-owned development bank in Botswana.

Location
The headquarters and main branch of NDB Botswana are located at 161 Queens Road, in the central business district of Gaborone, Botswana's capital city. The bank maintains branch offices in Francistown, Maun and Palapye. The geographical coordinates of the bank's headquarters are 24°39'25.0"S, 25°55'07.0"E (Latitude:-24.656944; Longitude:25.918611).

Overview
NDB Botswana is a national development financial institution. While all development economic activity funding is considered, as of 2020, the focus is on funding agricultural development and the establishment of food security in Botswana. As of 31 March 2017, the bank's total assets were BPW:1,444,758,000 (US$138 million), with shareholders' equity of BPW:587,444,000 (US$52 million).

History
National Development Bank of Botswana was established in 1963 by act of parliament. Its main objective is to provide financial services to Botswana’s business sector. Its second objective is to earn satisfactory returns on shareholders' funds.

Ownership
The bank is 100 percent owned by the government of Botswana.

Board of Directors
 the following constitute the nine-person Board of Directors of the bank: 1. Wilfred Mpai: Chairman 2. Patricia M. Makepe: Deputy Chairperson 3. Mendel Ngoni Nlanda: Non-Executive Director 4. Olefile K. Mokatse: Non-Executive Director 5. Mmadima Nyathi: Non-Executive Director 6. Gerald N. Nthebolan: Non-Executive Director 7. Onthusitse M. Mosiakgabo: Non-Executive Director 8. Oganeditse Marata: Non-Executive Director and 9. Colleen M. Motswaiso: Non-Executive Director.

Senior management
The Chief Executive Officer, supervises nine other senior managers. As of July 2020, the CEO is Ms Lorato Morapedi.

See also 

 African Development Bank
 Uganda Development Bank Limited
 Development Bank of Kenya
 Botswana Unified Revenue Service

References

External links 
 Official website

Banks of Botswana
Gaborone
Banks established in 1963
1963 establishments in Bechuanaland Protectorate
Government-owned companies of Botswana
National development banks